The Rio Grande Valley Dorados were a professional arena football team. They began playing in 2004 as an expansion member of af2, the minor league to the Arena Football League. They played their home games at Obra Homes Field at Dodge Arena in Hidalgo, Texas.

They had been fairly successful in their existence including a 15–1 regular season in 2007 before losing to Bossier-Shreveport in the American Conference semifinals.

The team folded in 2009 after the af2 folded, at which point the relaunched Arena Football League (AFL) then owned the rights to the Dorados name and logo. The AFL let the trademarks lapse and a new team using the same branding was launched in 2019 as part of a regional league called the International Arena Football League. The new team, owned by Juan and Erika Arevalo, markets itself as a continuation of the defunct af2 team.

Season-by-season

|-
|2004 || 6 || 10 || 0 || 4th NC Southwest || —
|-
|2005 || 10 || 6 || 0 || 2nd NC West || Won NC Quarterfinal (Quad City)Won NC Semifinal (Tulsa)Lost NC Championship (Memphis)
|-
|2006 || 7 || 9 || 0 || 4th NC Midwest || —
|-
|2007 || 15 || 1 || 0 || 1st NC Southwest ||Won Round 1 (Alabama)Lost AC Semifinals (Bossier-Shreveport)
|-
|2008 || 7 || 9 || 0 || 3rd NC Southwest || —
|-
|2009 || 9 || 7 || 0 || 3rd NC Southwest || Lost NC Round 1 (Bossier-Shreveport)
|-
!Totals || 57 || 45 || 0
|colspan="2"| (including playoffs)
|}

Notable players
 Mike Duncan – WR/DB
 Eddie Moten – DS – 2012 member of the Orlando Predators
 Dustin Bell – K
 Chris Canty – WR/DB
 Torry Joubert – WR/DB
 Dontae Saulter – WR
 Quincy Carter – QB 
 Joe McClendon – CB/S
 Ramonce Taylor – WR - Left Dorados in 2009 for the CFL. Came back to play the rest of the season with Dorados.
 Jake Bauer – K
 Tyler Matia - OL - Also played for Coventry Jets winning 2008 Britbowl and reaching quarterfinals against Swarco Raiders in 2008 Eurobowl

2009 RGV Dorados roster

Rivalry between RGV and Corpus Christi
This rivalry started heating up when Corpus Christi became a team in the AF2, in 2007. The Inaugural game for Corpus Christi was on April 7, 2007. They hosted the heavily favored Rio Grande Valley Dorados. The Dorados romped the Sharks 66-28 in the first game ever for the Corpus Christi Sharks.

 The Dorados lead the series (9-1) against the Sharks

2007 
RGV won 66-28 April 7, 2007
RGV won 45-20 May 11, 2007
RGV won 78-17 June 30, 2007

2008 
CC won 61-54 April 12, 2008
RGV won 53-52 May 3, 2008
RGV won 48-26 July 14, 2008

2009 
RGV won 40-33 March 28, 2009
RGV won 77-50 April 25, 2009
RGV won 51-48 June 13, 2009
RGV won 78-51 July 25, 2009

Head coaches

2004: Gary Gussman, 6–10 in the regular season
2005: Kevin Guy, 10–6 in the regular season; 2–1 in playoffs
2006–2009: Marty Hammond, 38–26 in the regular season; 1–1 in playoffs

References

External links

 Official website
 Rio Grande Valley Dorados on ArenaFan

 
2004 establishments in Texas
2009 disestablishments in Texas